The discography of Faithless, a British electronica band, consists of seven studio albums, four remix albums, three compilation albums, thirty singles and a number of other appearances.

The band's latest studio album, All Blessed, was released on 23 October 2020. It is the band's first release on their own label, Nate's Tunes, and their first studio album in a decade.

Albums

Studio albums

Remix albums

Compilation albums

Singles

Promotional singles

Other charted songs

Songs appearances

Films

Television

Video games

Music videos

DVDs
Live at the Melkweg Amsterdam (2001)
Forever Faithless – The Greatest Hits (16 May 2005)
Live at Alexandra Palace (October 2005)
Faithless – Live in Moscow (Filmed in 2007, Released on DVD, 17 November 2008)

References

External Links
 

Electronic music discographies
Discographies of British artists